Bang Khanun is one of the nine subdistricts (tambon) of Bang Kruai District, in Nonthaburi Province, Thailand. Neighbouring subdistricts are (from north clockwise) Bang Krang, Bang Si Thong, Wat Chalo, Maha Sawat and Bang Khun Kong. In 2020 it had a total population of 6,603 people.

Administration

Central administration
The subdistrict is subdivided into 5 administrative villages (muban).

Local administration
The whole area of the subdistrict is covered by Bang Khanun Subdistrict Administrative Organization.

References

External links
Website of Bang Khanun Subdistrict Administrative Organization

Tambon of Nonthaburi province
Populated places in Nonthaburi province